Norman George Cowans (born 17 April 1961) is a former cricketer who played in 19 Test matches and 23 One Day Internationals between 1982 and 1985 for the England cricket team. He played first-class cricket for Middlesex and Hampshire County Cricket Clubs.

Cowans was a right-arm fast bowler and a right-handed lower-order batsman and became the 500th person to play Test cricket for England.

Life and career
Born at Enfield in Saint Mary Parish, Jamaica, Cowans moved to England with his family when he was eleven. He played County Championship cricket for Middlesex and then Hampshire, winning four Championships (1982, 1985, 1990, and 1993) and four limited-overs titles (all with Middlesex) in his fifteen seasons.  On his first tour overseas, on England's defence of the Ashes in Australia in 1982/83, he often struggled, was wayward in line and length, and was underbowled by captain, Bob Willis, until the crucial Fourth Test at Melbourne, a match England had to win if they had any hope of retaining the Ashes they won at home in 1981.

Cowans played the game of his life at the MCG in 1982, where he took a match-winning 6 for 77, following his first innings 2 for 69 (which included the first-ball scalp of Greg Chappell), in England's dramatic three-run victory. This victory sent the series to Sydney for the deciding Fifth Test, which ended in a draw, meaning Australia regained the Ashes. The Wisden review of the tour observed: "In retrospect Willis may have felt that more could and should have been made of Norman Cowans's bowling".

The following summer Cowans was in the England squad for the 1983 Cricket World Cup, and although he only played one match in the tournament, he helped England to win a subsequent test series against New Zealand. The following winter Cowans took his second and last five-wicket haul in Tests, helping to derail a Pakistan run chase with three wickets in an over. England lost this series, but the following winter Cowans was on the winning side, and he played in every test as David Gower's team surprised India. This was Cowans' most lucrative series, and he took 14 wickets, including two at the start of India's second innings in the Delhi Test, a result that at the time "ended England's longest-ever spell without a victory".

Cowans played for England for the last time in the 1985 Ashes, assisting England's victory in the 1st Test at Leeds by extending England's first-innings lead by 49 in a last-wicket stand with Paul Downton and taking the wickets of David Boon and Allan Border. In this series England would regain the Ashes lost in 1982-3, and it would be their last victory in a home Ashes series for 20 years. Although he toured Sri Lanka with an England 'B' side that winter, taking 6 for 50 in the last unofficial 'Test', he was not picked for England again.

He played his best Test cricket away from England (he averaged ten runs fewer a wicket overseas). He remained however part of a successful Middlesex team, bowling alongside Wayne Daniel, Simon Hughes, Neil Williams, and, eventually Angus Fraser. A highlight of his county career came in 1983 when he took 4 for 39 to help Middlesex win the final of the Benson and Hedges Cup, having previously taken 4 for 33, and won the man of the match award, in the semi-final. As late as 1990 and 1993 he was still part of the Middlesex sides that won the County Championship, topping the first-class bowling averages in 1993 with 16 wickets at 14.62 (although only playing 5 County Championship matches and 1 university match).

References

1961 births
Cricketers at the 1983 Cricket World Cup
English cricketers
English people of Jamaican descent
England Test cricketers
England One Day International cricketers
Middlesex cricketers
Hampshire cricketers
Black British sportsmen
Living people
Marylebone Cricket Club cricketers
Jamaican emigrants to the United Kingdom
D. B. Close's XI cricketers
People from Saint Mary Parish, Jamaica